Sri Harikathe is a 2010 Indian Kannada language romantic thriller film directed by Dayal Padmanabhan. The film stars Sri Murali, Pooja Gandhi, Radhika Gandhi and Naveen Krishna in pivotal roles.  The film is jointly produced by S. A. Chinne Gowda and M. N. Kumar.

The film release co-coincided with another Sri Murali film Sihigali on 12 March 2010.

Plot
Hari (Sriimurali), a young businessman and Neha (Radhika Gandhi), a PhD student at the Singapore university love each other and get married. However, Neha insists that they start the family only after she submits and completes her thesis. Hari agrees to the condition for about 6 months. Later again, Neha asks for 3 more months time until she gets prepared to start a family. This makes the couple clash and Neha leaves for an educational trip abroad. Meanwhile, Hari brings a celebrity model (Pooja) home and Neha finds them getting cosy after which the celebrity is seen murdered. The rest of the plot deals with the "who-done-it" and the mystery around the celebrity's death.

Cast 

 Srimurali as Hari
 Pooja Gandhi as Neha
 Radhika Gandhi as Prakruthi
 Naveen Krishna as Ram
 Srinivasa Murthy
 Sihi Kahi Chandru
 Padmaja Rao
 Sihi Kahi Geetha
 Achyutha Kumar
 Nagashekar

Production
Sisters Pooja Gandhi and Radhika Gandhi acted together for the first time with this film. The entire filming got completed in 45 days at a stretch. The main filming took place across the Coastal part of Karnataka namely Mangalore and Surathkal. It was revealed by the director that the film would be a thriller with the lead actress Pooja having some grey shades in her character.

Soundtrack 
All the songs are composed and scored by Sameer Kulkarni. The track list consists of 6 songs penned by actor Naveen Krishna, Yogaraj Bhat, Nagathihalli Chandrashekar, M. L. Prasanna among others.

Reception

Critical response 

Shruti Indira Lakshminarayana of Rediff.com scored the film at 3 out of 5 stars and says "While the first half moves quickly, the movie stretches towards the end. The story is preachy but in a comical way. A scene where Pooja and Radhika hug each other despite being the 'other woman' and wife is however hard to digest. The onscreen sisterly act could have been done away with too. Watch Shriharikathe if you can ignore some of the 'machismo' dialogues that reflect gender stereo types in our society". A critic from Bangalore Mirror wrote  "Naveen Krishna as the womaniser delivers a brilliant performance. His presence takes his scenes to a higher level. The rest of the characters, though not impressive, pass the test. The visuals do not strain the eyes and the music does not hamper the ears. So a movie you can safely plan to spend some time on". B S Srivani from Deccan Herald wrote "The biggest disappointment comes from watching Navin Krishna - why is this actor still on the sidelines? If the leisurely pace can be tolerated, “Sriharikathe” is an easy favourite pastime".

References 

2010 films
2010s Kannada-language films
Indian romantic thriller films
2010s romantic thriller films